Arty McGlynn (7 August 1944 – 18 December 2019) was an Irish guitarist born in Omagh, County Tyrone. In addition to his solo work, he collaborated with different notable groups such as Patrick Street, Planxty, Four Men and a Dog, De Dannan and the Van Morrison Band. He played guitar on the critically acclaimed 1989 Van Morrison album, Avalon Sunset. He also played duo performances and recordings with uilleann piper Liam O'Flynn, and his wife, fiddle player Nollaig Casey.

Discography

Solo
 McGlynn's Fancy (1994 / originally released in 1979)
 Celtic Airs (2000) [A re-release of McGlynn's Fancy]

With Van Morrison
 Inarticulate Speech of the Heart (1983)
 Avalon Sunset (1989)
 Days Like This (1995)

With Enya
 The Celts (1986)

With Patrick Street
 Patrick Street (1986)
 No. 2 Patrick Street (1988)
 Irish Times (1990)
 All in Good Time (1993)

With Nollaig Casey
 Lead the Knave (1989)
 Causeway (1995)
 The music of what happened (2004)
 Traditional Irish Jigs, Reels and Airs (2005) [A re-release of Lead the Knave]

With Liam O'Flynn
 Out to an Other Side (1993)
 The Given Note (1995)
 The Piper's Call (1999)

With Frankie Gavin & Aidan Coffey
 Irlande (1994)

With Alan Kelly
 Mosaic (2001)

With John Carty (musician)
 Yeh, That's All It Is
 John Carty & Brian Rooney
 Pathway to the Well
 At It Again

With Noel Hill
 The Irish Concertina Two (2005)

References

Specific

External links
 
 Arty's Discography at Taramusic.com
 link Arty's Biography at Taramusic.com

1944 births
2019 deaths
People from Omagh
Guitarists from Northern Ireland
Irish male guitarists
Patrick Street members
Musicians from County Tyrone